George Levi Knox (1841-1927) from Indianapolis Indiana, was born in Statesville, Tennessee to slave parents. He was a runaway slave who served both the South and the North in the American Civil War. Later in life he published The Indianapolis Freeman from 1893 to 1926. He was an activist and a book author. Knox also owned a Negro league baseball team, Indianapolis's Barber B.B.C. His grandson, George L. Knox II, was a pilot with the Tuskegee Airman during World War II.

Early life
Knox was born in Statesville, Tennessee in 1841 and sold into slavery in 1844, at three years old. He married Auralia Susie Knox and together they had four children. During the Civil War his master took him to the front lines. Knox escaped and joined the Union where he accompanied the 55th Indiana Infantry Regiment.

After the war, Knox learned the barber business. He was successful and in 1884 he opened his own barber and shaving parlor business at a cost of $10,000.

Knox's first wife Auralia died in 1910. In 1914, he married a woman named Mrs. Margaret Nickens.

Military
As a slave, Knox was taken by his master to the front lines to serve the Confederate States of America. He was able to escape and was welcomed by the Northern Union troops. He served with 55th Indiana Infantry Regiment as a teamster. Eventually he made his way to Indianapolis with the 55th and left the military service.

Career
In 1884 Knox moved to Indianapolis and opened several barbershops and shaving parlors. The barbershops employed black barbers but only served white people. He met many influential white people through his whites only barber shops, and he had an unsuccessful run for US Congress.

In the early 1900s Knox ran shaving parlors in Indianapolis. He owned an amateur Negro baseball team which was called Indianapolis's Barber Base Ball Club (B.B.C.). His son Elwood pitched for the team.

Knox purchased The Indianapolis Freeman, an African-American newspaper (or race paper), and was the publisher from 1893 to 1926. The paper was called "A National Illustrated Colored Newspaper". Booker T. Washington was a contributor. The paper had a circulation of 25,000. It was also sold internationally and covered everything from small black communities to sports and entertainment. The paper came out on Sundays and it was said their negative review of could ruin a career.

Knox authored Slave and Freeman, the Autobiography of George L. Knox.

Death
Knox died on August 24, 1927, in Richmond, Virginia from a paralytic stroke.

See also 

List of African-American abolitionistsList of enslaved people
List of African-American activists
Slavery in the United States

References

19th-century publishers (people)
Newspaper publishers (people)
1841 births
1927 deaths
Fugitive American slaves
19th-century African-American people
American activists
African-American abolitionists
African Americans in the American Civil War
African-American writers